Jērcēni Parish is an administrative unit of Valmiera Municipality in the Vidzeme region of Latvia. In the Inter-war period, it was a part of Valka County.

Towns, villages and settlements of Jērcēni parish

References

Parishes of Latvia
Valmiera Municipality
Vidzeme